Frederick Blackett (17 January 1900 – 17 May 1979) was a British hurdler who competed at the 1924 Summer Olympics.

References

1900 births
1979 deaths
Athletes (track and field) at the 1924 Summer Olympics
British male hurdlers
Olympic athletes of Great Britain